Israeli Druze or Druze Israelis are an ethnoreligious minority among the Arab citizens of Israel.

In 2019, there were 143,000 Druze people living within Israel and the Israeli-occupied Golan Heights, comprising 1.6% of the total population of Israel.

Although Druzism, their ethnic religion, originally developed out of Ismaʿilism (a branch of Shia Islam), the Druze do not consider themselves Muslims.
In 1957, the Israeli government designated Druze Israelis as a distinct ethnic community at the request of Druze communal leaders. Alongside the Jewish majority and the Circassian minority, the Druze minority is required by law to serve in the Israel Defense Forces, and members of the community have also attained top positions in Israeli politics and public service. As is the case for the Circassian community, only men from the community are drafted, while women are exempted; in contrast with Jews, for whom military service is also mandatory for women.
 
Before the Israeli Declaration of Independence, Druze people were not recognized as a religious community, and were discriminated against by the local judicial system. Druze Israelis are native Arabic-speakers; a 2017 poll conducted by the Pew Research Center reported that the majority of Israel's Druze also ethnically self-identify as Arabs. Israel has the world's third-largest Druze population, after Syria and Lebanon; the majority of Druze Israelis are concentrated in northern Israel.

Religious development

The Druze religion branched off from the religion of Islam, and is now considered its own religion separate from Islam. The religion was created in the 10th and 11th centuries in Egypt, with aspects of Hindu and Greek philosophy incorporated into the tenets of Islam. Conversions are not permitted in the Druze religion, because they believe that the first generation after the establishment of the Druze religion had an opportunity then to join the religion, and everyone alive today is reincarnated from that generation. Much like the Abrahamic faiths, the Druze religion is monotheistic, and recognizes many prophets, including Jesus, John the Baptist, Mohammed, Khidr and Moses. Their most respected prophet in their religion is Jethro, Moses' father-in-law.

The Epistles of Wisdom is the foundational text of the Druze faith. The Druze faith incorporates elements of Islam's Ismailism, Gnosticism, Neoplatonism, Pythagoreanism, Christianity, Hinduism and other philosophies and beliefs, creating a distinct and secretive theology known to interpret esoterically religious scriptures, and to highlight the role of the mind and truthfulness.

Within the Druze community, there are two different sub-groups. There is the al-Juhhal, or the Ignorant, and al-Uqqal, the Knowledgeable. The al-Juhhal group does not have the permission to view the holy texts, and they do not attend religious meetings. About 80% of the Druze people fall into this category of the Ignorant. The al-Uqqal must follow ascetic rulings including following a dress code. The most powerful 5% of the Knowledgeable group are where the spiritual leaders of the religion come from. As for important rules that the Druze must follow, they are not allowed to drink alcohol, eat pork, or smoke tobacco, similarly to the dietary laws in Islam. Polygamy is prohibited, and men and women are viewed as equals. Many of the Druze living in Israel fully participate in Israeli society, and many of them serve in the Israeli Defense Forces.

The Druze revere the father-in-law of Moses, Jethro or Reuel, a Kenite shepherd and priest of Midian. In Exodus, Moses' father-in-law is initially referred to as "Reuel" (Exodus 2:18) but then as "Jethro" (Exodus 3:1). According to the biblical narrative, Jethro joined and assisted the Israelites in the desert during the Exodus, accepted monotheism, but ultimately rejoined his own people. The tomb of Jethro near Tiberias is the most important religious site for the Druze community and they gather there every April.

Amin Tarif was the qadi, or spiritual leader, of the Druze in Mandatory Palestine from 1928 and then Israel until his death in 1993. He was highly esteemed and regarded by many within the community as the preeminent spiritual authority in the Druze world.

In January 2004, the current spiritual leader, Sheikh Muwaffak Tarīf, called on all non-Jews in Israel to observe the Seven Noahide Laws, as laid down in the Bible and expounded upon in Jewish tradition. The mayor of the Galilean city of Shefa-'Amr also signed the document. The declaration includes the commitment to make a "... better humane world based on the Seven Noahide Commandments and the values they represent commanded by the Creator to all mankind through Moses on Mount Sinai".

History in the Levant

The religion incorporates elements of Isma'ilism, Gnosticism, Neoplatonism, and other philosophies. The Druze call themselves Ahl al-Tawhid – "People of Unitarianism or Monotheism" – or al-Muwaḥḥidūn, "Unitarians, Monotheists". Amin Tarif was the preeminent religious leader of the community until his death in 1993.

Historically the relationship between the Druze and Muslims has been characterized by intense persecution. The Druze faith is often classified as a branch of Isma'ili. Even though the faith originally developed out of Ismaili Islam, most Druze do not identify as Muslims, and they do not accept the five pillars of Islam. The Druze have frequently experienced persecution by different Muslim regimes such as the Shia Fatimid Caliphate, Sunni Ottoman Empire, and Egypt Eyalet. The persecution of the Druze included massacres, demolishing Druze prayer houses and holy places and forced conversion to Islam. Those were no ordinary killings in the Druze's narrative, they were meant to eradicate the whole community according to the Druze narrative.

The relationship between the Druze and Jews has been controversial, Anti-Jewish (antisemitic) bias material is contained in the Druze literature such as the Epistles of Wisdom; for example, in an epistle ascribed to one of the founders of Druzism, Baha al-Din al-Muqtana, probably written sometime between AD 1027 and AD 1042, accused Jews of killing the sacred prophets. On the other hand, Benjamin of Tudela, a Jewish traveler from the 12th century, pointed out that the Druze maintained good commercial relations with the Jews nearby, and, according to him, this was because the Druze liked the Jewish people. Yet, the Jews and Druze lived isolated from each other, except in few mixed towns such as Deir al-Qamar and Peki'in.

Conflict between Druze and Jews occurs during the Druze power struggle in Mount Lebanon, Jewish settlements of Galilee such as Safad and Tiberias were destroyed by the Druze in 1660. During the Druze revolt against the rule of Ibrahim Pasha of Egypt, the Jewish community in Safad was attacked by Druze rebels in early July 1838. The violence against the Jews included plundering their homes and desecrating their synagogues.

Attitude towards conflict between Jews and Palestinian Arabs

During the 1947–48 Civil War in Mandatory Palestine, the Druze in Mandatory Palestine were under pressure from both the Jewish Yishuv leadership and from the Palestinian Arab Higher Committee, and found it difficult to form an opinion about the conflict between the Jews and the Palestinian Arabs. Noble Druze men from nearby countries visited Druze villages in Palestine and preached neutrality. During the early days of the conflict, a meeting of all the noblemen from all the Druze villages was conducted in Daliyat al-Karmel, where they all agreed not to take part in the riots instigated by the Arab Higher Committee. This decision was backed by Druze leaders in Jabal al-Druze. In the Druze community, there were opposing trends: In mixed Druze and Muslim villages such as Isfiya, Shefa-'Amr, and Maghar, where there were old sectarian disputes, and in Druze villages near Haifa and the Jewish settlement in the western Galilee, the local Druze leaders tended to prefer the Jews in the conflict; at the Druze villages deep in Arab areas, the local leaders were more careful with support of the Jews. Josh Palmon was tasked by the Jewish Agency for Israel to manage the relationship with the Druze. He initially led a preventive approach with the Druze, aimed at making sure the Druze will not join the Arab Higher Committee.

The contacts between the Druze and the Jewish leadership were made through Labib Hussein Abu Rokan from Isfya and Salah-Hassan Hanifes from Shefa-'Amr (both became members of the Knesset after Israel's establishment). Hanifas managed to bring the Druze village Yarka to co-operate with the Jews.

Arrival of Druze volunteers to fight in the 1948 Arab–Israeli War 
During the war, Druze volunteers arrived to Mandatory Palestine in order to help defend the Druze villages there. When the Arab Liberation Army (ALA) was created by the Arab League, Shakib Wahhab, a Syrian–Druze military commander resigned from the Syrian army and established a Druze battalion for the ALA, collecting Druze volunteers who joined mostly due to economic reasons from Syria and Lebanon. Wahhab brought around 500 men and arrived to Shefa-'Amr in Palestine, where he established his command on 30 March 1948. The commander of the ALA, Fawzi al-Qawuqji, planned to deploy the Druze battalion in the northern regions of Samaria under his command, but the military committee of the Arab League decided to establish a separate command for the Druze for the region near the city of Haifa, excluding Acre. Wahhab traveled through the western Galilee region and sent men to the Druze villages of the Carmel. As the Druze volunteers arrived, there were attempts to talk with the volunteers, due to fear local Druze will join them. Najib Mansour, the head of Isfiya, met with agents of the Hagannah in Haifa to discuss the arrival of Wahhab. Mansour did not agree to the demand that the local Druze would forcibly oppose the volunteers, and instead proposed the Jews bribe Wahhab to abandon his command.

Demographics 

According to the Israeli Central Bureau of Statistics census in 2020, the Druze make up about 7.6% of the Arab citizens of Israel, and the Druze population in Israel was approximately 145,000. At the end of 2019,  approximately 81% of the Israeli Druze population lived in the Northern District and 19% lived in the Haifa District, and the largest population of Druze were Daliyat al-Karmel and Yirka.

The Israeli Druze population growth rate of 1.4%, which is lower than the Muslim population growth rate (2.5%) and the total population growth (1.7%), but higher than the Arab Christian population growth rate (1.0%). At the end of 2017, the average age of the Israeli Druze was 27.9. About 26.3% of the Israeli Druze population are under 14 years old and about 6.1% of the Israeli Druze are 65 years and over. Since the year 2000, the Israeli Druze community has witnessed a significant decrease in fertility-rate and a significant increase in life expectancy. The fertility rate for Israeli Druze in 2017 is 2.1 children per woman, while the fertility rate among Jewish women (3.2) and Muslim women (3.4) and the fertility rate among Israeli Christian women (1.9).

Settlements

The Druze in Israel live in a handful of sectarian villages and several mixed-religion Arab localities in pre-1967 Israel (Upper and Lower Galilee and Mount Carmel) and on the Golan Heights. The population figures are as follows (absolute figures and percentage of overall population):

Language 

The Druze citizens of Israel are Arabic in language and culture, and their mother tongue is the Arabic Language. The Druze Arabic dialect, especially in the villages, is often different from the other regional Arabic dialects. Druze Arabic dialect is distinguished from others by retention of the phoneme /qāf/. Linguistically speaking, Israeli Druze are fluently bilingual, speaking both a Central Northern Levantine Arabic dialect and Hebrew. In Druze Arab homes and towns in Israel, the primary language spoken is Arabic, while some Hebrew words have entered the colloquial Arabic dialect. They often use Hebrew characters to write their Arabic dialect online.

Socio-economic status 
A study published by the Taub Center for Social Policy Studies in 2017 found that Druze population has the second highest achievements in the Arab sector on all indices: bagrut scores, rates of college graduates, and fields of employment. While the Israeli Arab Christian population has the highest achievements.

Educational prospects 
According to the Israeli Central Bureau of Statistics census in 2020, 79.9% of Druze in Israel were entitled to a matriculation certificate, which was higher than the number of Muslims (60.3%), but was lower than the number of Christians (83.6%) Jews (80.2%) with a matriculation certificate. According to the Israeli Central Bureau of Statistics census in 2020, 15.3% of Druze in Israel have a college degree, which was lower than the number of Christians (70.9%), but similar to the number of Muslim (10%) with a degree.

Status of Druze in the Israeli-occupied Golan Heights

There are four remaining Druze villages in the Israeli-annexed portion of the Golan Heights—Majdal Shams, Mas'ade, Buq'ata, and Ein Qiniyye—in which 23,000 Druze live. Most of the Druze residents of the Golan Heights consider themselves to be Syrians and refuse to take Israeli citizenship, instead holding Israeli permanent resident status, and in place of an Israeli passport use an Israeli-issued laissez-passer document for travelling abroad, on which the citizenship paragraph is left empty.

Since the adoption of the 1981 Golan Heights Law, the territory has been under Israeli civil law, and incorporated into the Israeli system of local councils. After the annexation of the Golan Heights in 1981, the Israeli government offered citizenship to all non-Israelis living in the territory, but (as of 2011), less than 10% of the local Druze accepted it. In 2012, however, due to the Syrian Civil War, dozens of young Druze have applied for Israeli citizenship – a much larger number than in previous years. By 2017, nearly 5,500 out of 26,500 residents had applied for and received an Israeli passport since 1981. The yearly number of applications steadily rose, with 183 applying in 2016, compared to only five in 2000.

During the 2011 Syrian uprising, Druze in the Golan Heights held several rallies in support of Syrian leader Bashar al-Assad. Public support for the Assad government has historically been high among Golan Druze, and Syria has secured agreements with the Israeli government to permit Golan Druze to conduct trade across the border with Syria. Some tensions have recently arisen in the community due to differing stances on the Syrian Civil War, though open public support for the Syrian opposition has been relatively uncommon.

In the 2009 elections, 1,193 residents of the Alawite village of Ghajar and 809 residents of the Druze villages were eligible to vote, out of approximately 1,200 Ghajar residents and 12,600 Druze village residents who were of voting age. As Israel does not recognize the Syrian citizenship of Golan Druze, they are defined in Israeli records as "residents of the Golan Heights". Those who apply for Israeli citizenship are entitled to vote in Israeli elections, run for Knesset, and receive an Israeli passport. Residents of Majdal Shams are not drafted into the Israel Defense Forces.

Religiosity 
According to a Pew Research Center survey conducted in 2015, Druze in Israel are generally more religious than Israeli Jews, but less than Israeli Christians and Muslims. Around half (49%) say religion is very important in their lives. About one third (26%) pray daily and 25% report that they attend prayer-houses of the Druze (khalwat) at least once a week. Israeli Druze also are more likely than Jews and less likely than Christians and Muslims to participate in weekly worship services. Nearly all (99%) Israeli Druze believe in God, of whom 84% say they are absolutely certain. According to the Israel Democracy Institute survey conducted in 2015, 43% of Druze in Israel identified as traditional, 36% identified as not religious at all, 14% identified as religious, 7% identified as very religious.

Beliefs 
According to a Pew Research Center survey conducted in 2015, the majority of Druzes are not comfortable with their child marrying outside of the faith, Druze are about equally uncomfortable with the prospect of a child of theirs marrying a Jew (87%), Muslim (85%) or Christian (87%). Christians and Druze also are more likely than Jews to say a good religious education is important for their children.

Identity 

According to a Pew Research Center survey conducted in 2015, Druze in Israel are less likely than Christians or Muslims to say they are proud of their identity. About 90% say they have a strong sense of belonging to the Druze community. Two thirds (64%) believe that they have a special responsibility to help fellow members of their religious group who are in need around the world.

The nature of Druze identity varies among Druze well. Druze in Israel are about evenly divided among those who say their identity is mainly a matter of religion (18%), those who say being Druze is mainly about ancestry and/or culture (47%) and those who say their identity is characterized by a combination of religion and ancestry/culture (34%).

Politics 

Israeli Druze do not consider themselves Muslim, and see their faith as a separate and independent religion. While compared to other Israeli Christians and Muslims, Druze place less emphasis on Arab identity and self-identify more as Israeli. However, they were less ready for personal relationships with Jews compared to Israeli Muslims and Christians.

In a survey conducted in 2008 by Dr. Yusuf Hassan of Tel Aviv University 94% of Druze respondents identified as "Druze-Israelis" in the religious and national context, while a 2017 Pew Research Center poll reported that while 99% of Muslims and 96% of Christians identified as ethnically Arab, a smaller share of Druze, 71%, identified likewise. Other Druze respondents identify their ethnicity as "Druze" or "Druze-Arab". According to the Israel Democracy Institute survey conducted in 2015, around 54% of Druze respondents saied that religious identity (the Druze identity) is the most important identity for them, followed by Israeli identity (37%) and Arab identity (5%).

Military service and Israeli politics
Druze citizens are prominent in the Israel Defense Forces and in politics. The bond between Jewish and Druze soldiers is commonly known by the term "a covenant of blood" (Hebrew: ברית דמים, brit damim).

Five Druze lawmakers were elected to serve in the 18th Knesset, a disproportionately large number considering their population. Reda Mansour, a Druze poet, historian, and diplomat, explained: "We are the only non-Jewish minority that is drafted into the military, and we have an even higher percentage in the combat units and as officers than the Jewish members themselves. So we are considered a very nationalistic, patriotic community."

Druze pro-Zionism 

In 1973, Amal Nasser el-Din founded the Zionist Druze Circle, a group whose aim was to encourage the Druze to support the state of Israel fully and unreservedly. Today, thousands of Israeli Druze belong to Druze Zionist movements.

In 2007, Nabiah A-Din, mayor of Kisra-Sumei, rejected the "multi-cultural" Israeli constitution proposed by the Israeli Arab organization Adalah: "The state of Israel is a Jewish state as well as a democratic state that espouses equality and elections. We invalidate and reject everything that the Adalah organization is requesting", he said. According to A-din, the fate of the Druze and the Circassians in Israel is intertwined with that of the state. "This is a blood pact, and a pact of the living. We are unwilling to support a substantial alteration to the nature of this state, to which we tied our destinies prior to its establishment", he said.  there were 7,000 registered members in the Druze Zionist movement. In 2009, the movement held a Druze Zionist youth conference with 1,700 participants.

In a survey conducted in 2008 by Dr. Yusuf Hassan of Tel Aviv University found that out of 764 Druze participants, more than 94% identify as "Druze-Israelis" in the religious and national context.

On 30 June 2011, Haaretz reported that a growing number of Israeli Druze were joining elite units of the military, leaving the official Druze battalion, Herev, under-staffed. This trend has led to calls for its disbandment.

On May 15, 2015, it was announced that the Druze battalion Herev would be shut down, thereby allowing Druze soldiers to integrate into the rest of the IDF, a wish that was relayed to IDF senior staff by leaders in the Druze community as well as former Herev battalion commanders. After the July 2015 Draft, the IDF no longer listed the Druze unit as an option. By September 2015, the battalion had been disbanded, and its soldiers joined to other units.

Druze also serve in elite units of the IDF such as the Sayeret Matkal, and there are three Druze combat pilots serving in the Israeli Air Force.

Intercommunal relationships

Relationship with Jewish Israelis 
In 1948, many Druze volunteered for the Israeli army and no Druze villages were destroyed or permanently abandoned. Since the establishment of the state of Israel, the Druze have demonstrated solidarity with Israel and distanced themselves from Arab and Islamic radicalism. Israeli Druze citizens serve in the Israel Defense Forces. The Jewish-Druze partnership was often referred to as "a covenant of blood" (Hebrew: ברית דמים, brit damim) in recognition of the common military yoke carried by the two peoples for the security of the country. From 1957, the Israeli government formally recognized the Druze as a separate religious community, and are defined as a distinct ethnic group in the Israeli Ministry of Interior's census registration. Israeli Druze do not consider themselves Muslim, and see their faith as a separate and independent religion. While compared to other Israeli Christians and Muslims, Druze place less emphasis on Arab identity and self-identify more as Israeli. However, they were less ready for personal relationships with Jews compared to Israeli Muslims and Christians.

Relationship with Christian Israelis 
 

The relationship between the Druze and Christians in Israel has been characterized by harmony and peaceful coexistence, and they lives in peace and friendship together. With the exception of rare clashes, including acts of violence by the Druze against Christians in 2005 in the town of Maghar. Druze and Christians in Israel celebrate each other's births, weddings, funerals, and celebrations such as the Christian festival of Mar Ilyas (Saint Elias) in Haifa. Many Druze and Muslims attend Christian schools in Israel, because Christian schools are high-performing and among the best schools in the country.

Contact between Christians (members of the Maronite, Eastern Orthodox, Melkite, and other churches) and the Unitarian Druze led to the presence of mixed villages and towns in Galilee region, Mount Carmel, and the Israeli-occupied portion of the Golan Heights. This includes Abu Snan, Daliyat al-Karmel, Ein Qiniyye, Hurfeish, Isfiya, Kafr Yasif, Kisra-Sumei, Majdal Shams, Maghar, Peki'in, Rameh and Shefa-Amr, where more than 82,000 Druze and 30,000 Christians live together in this mixed villages and towns. Before Israel's occupation, Christians accounted for 12% of the population of the Golan Heights, and they tend to have a high presentation in science and in the white collar professions.

See also
List of Israeli Druze
IDF Sword Battalion
Religion in Israel
Ahuzat Naftali

References

Further reading

Druze community in Israel